William Frye (October 5, 1921 – November 3, 2017) was an American producer. He served as the producer for the films Airport 1975 and Airport '77 of the Airport film series. Frye died in November 2017 of natural causes at his home in Palm Desert, California, at the age of 96.

Selected filmography 
 The Trouble with Angels (1966)
 Where Angels Go, Trouble Follows (1968)
 Airport 1975 (1974)
 Airport '77 (1977)
 Raise the Titanic (1980)

References

External links 

1921 births
2017 deaths
People from Salinas, California
Film producers from California
Television producers from California
American film producers
American television producers
20th-century American people
21st-century American people